The Battle of Martinique, also known as the Combat de la Dominique, took place on 17 April 1780 during the American Revolutionary War in the West Indies between the British Royal Navy and the French Navy.

Origins 
In March 1780, the French chief commander for the West Indies and North America, Charles Henri Hector d'Estaing, was succeeded by Comte de Guichen.  Together with François Claude Amour, marquis de Bouillé, de Guichen planned a combined attack on a British West Indies Island. On 13 April Guichen sailed from Martinique with a fleet of 23 ships of the line and 3,000 troops.  The newly arrived British commander based in St. Lucia, George Brydges Rodney, was notified immediately of the French departure, and gave chase with 20 ships of the line. On 16 April, his sentinels spotted de Guichen westward of Martinique.

Battle 
The fleets began manoeuvring for the advantage of the weather gage on the morning of 17 April. By 8:45, Rodney had reached a position to the windward of de Guichen, in a relatively close formation. To escape the danger to his rear, de Guichen ordered his line to wear and sail to the north, stringing out the line in the process. This forced Rodney to go through another series of manoeuvres to regain his position, which he did by late morning. At this point, he hoped to engage the rear and centre of de Guichen's elongated line, concentrating his power to maximize damage there before de Guichen's van could join the action. The signal that Rodney issued was for each ship to engage the appropriate ship it was paired with according to the disposition of the two fleets. He issued this signal with the understanding that his captains would execute it in the context of signals given earlier in the day that the enemy's rear was the target of the attack.

Unfortunately for the British, Robert Carkett (the commander of the lead ship HMS Stirling Castle) either misunderstood the signal or had forgotten the earlier one, and moved ahead to engage de Guichen's van; he was followed by the rest of Rodney's fleet, and the two lines ended up engaging ship to ship.

Thanks to the orderly fashion in which de Guichen's subordinate squadron-commanders dealt with the crisis, especially the third-in-command Comte de Grasse's rapid closing-up of the battle-line, de Guichen managed to extricate himself from a difficult situation and instead turn a narrow defeat to a drawn battle, although his and Marquis de Bouillé's objective to attack and seize Jamaica was thwarted.

During the battle, both Rodney's Sandwich passed through the French line of ships, and was heavily engaged by the Couronne, Triomphant, and Fendant,  for the next hour and a half before the French ship sdisengaged.

Aftermath 
Alfred Thayer Mahan wrote, "Rodney always considered this action of April 17th, 1780, to have been the great opportunity of his life; and his wrath was bitter against those by whose misconduct he conceived it had been frustrated."

David Hannay, the author of the biography on the Comte de Guichen in the 11th edition of the Encyclopædia Britannica, stated that Guichen had shown himself very skillful in handling a fleet throughout the campaign, and although there was no marked success, he had at least prevented the British admiral from doing any harm to the French islands in the Antilles.

On 15 May, both fleets encountered each other again, and again on 19 May. Both encounters were indecisive, with the French returning to Fort Royal, and the British to St. Lucia and Barbados. On 5 July, De Guichen departed Fort Royal, and ignoring entreaties to join Lafayette on the continent, departed for Europe on 16 Aug. Rodney, assuming de Guichen had headed for the continent before the hurricane season started, sailed for South Carolina, before arriving Sandy Hook on 14 September. On 16 November, Rodney returned to the West Indies.

Order of battle

British fleet

French fleet

Sources and references 
 Notes

Citations

References
 
 
 
 
 
 
 
 
 
 

Attribution
 

Battle of Martinique
Naval battles of the American Revolutionary War
Naval battles of the American Revolutionary War involving France
Battle of Martinique (1780)
1780 in the Caribbean